The  card is a rechargeable contactless smart card used on the JR West rail network in Japan. The card was launched on November 1, 2003 for usage on the Urban Network, which encompasses the major cities of Osaka, Kyoto and Kobe (Keihanshin). It is now usable on many other networks. The ICOCA area has gradually been expanded, and now includes the San'yo region through the Okayama and Hiroshima urban areas, and some lines in northern Shikoku, San'in and Hokuriku regions as of 2020. 

ICOCA stands for IC Operating CArd, but it is also a play on the phrase , an informal, Kansai dialect invitation meaning "Shall we go?" in Japanese (the standard, Tokyo dialect equivalent is ).

Functions/services 

Usage of the card involves passing it over a card reader.  The technology allows for the card to be read at some distance from the reader, so contact is not required, and many people leave the card in their wallet and just pass the wallet over the reader as they enter the ticket gate.

The balance on the card is displayed when you enter the ticket gate this way.  The balance is also displayed whenever the card is inserted into the ticket or fare adjustment machines as well.  A travel record is stored on the card, and can be displayed or printed out as well, at the fare adjustment machines.

On occasion, when travelling to a station where ICOCA is not supported, the card must be handed over to the staff at the exiting station, so that they can calculate the remaining fare, and also so that they can return a slip of paper which must be given to the staff at the next station where ICOCA is used.

Variants 
Standard ICOCA rechargeable card
ICOCA 定期券 (teikiken) – rechargeable card with added commuter pass
こどもICOCA (kodomo) – children's ICOCA
こどもICOCA 定期券 – children's ICOCA with added commuter pass
Smart ICOCA
Smart ICOCA 定期券
KIPS ICOCA  – this card is sold by Kintetsu
KIPS ICOCA 定期券 – this card is sold by Kintetsu
Shikoku ICOCA - this card is sold by JR Shikoku

Interoperation 

Via a number of reciprocal agreements, for ordinary fares, ICOCA can be used interoperably with various other mass transit smart card systems. As of 2014, ICOCA has interoperability with Kitaca, Suica, PASMO, TOICA, manaca, PiTaPa, SUGOCA, nimoca, hayakaken and several other local smart cards.
 Since August 1, 2004, in a reciprocal agreement with JR East, ICOCA is also usable in the Tokyo-Kantō area. Conversely, the Suica card of JR East can also be used on JR West rail services.
 Since January 21, 2006, ICOCA cards can also be used at all locations accepting Osaka PiTaPa smart cards.
 Since September 1, 2007, ICOCA is also usable in the Hiroshima-Okayama area.
 Since March 29, 2008, in a reciprocal agreement with JR Central, ICOCA is also usable in the Nagoya metropolitan area. Similarly, the TOICA card of JR Central can also be used on JR West rail services.
 Since March 5, 2011, in a reciprocal agreement with JR Kyushu, ICOCA is also usable in the Fukuoka-Saga area. Similarly, the SUGOCA card of JR Kyushu can also be used on JR West rail services.
 Since June 1, 2011, Keihan started selling its ICOCA.
 Since March 17, 2012, ICOCA became usable in some stations of JR Shikoku.
 Since December 1, 2012, Kintetsu started selling its ICOCA.
 Since March 23, 2013, nationwide inter-operation among 10 transportation smart cards started.

Retail
These cards are available at card vending machines at the train stations.  The card costs 2000 yen, which includes a 500 yen deposit that will be returned if the card is turned in.  The remaining 1500 yen is immediately available for train rides, and more money can be charged on to the card at similar ticket vending machines or fare adjustment machines inside each station.

The card may only be returned in JR West stations, however, so travelers who start their trip in JR west area and finish their trip elsewhere may not be able to return it before departure. Shikoku ICOCA cards are sold at several stations in Shikoku and can only be returned at those stations.

Technology 
The card incorporates contactless RFID technology developed by Sony, called FeliCa. The same technology is also deployed in the Edy electronic cash cards used in Japan, the Octopus card in Hong Kong & the old ezlink Card in Singapore.

See also 
Mass transit systems
Electronic money
List of smart cards

References

External links 
 Official homepage

Rail transport in Osaka Prefecture
Fare collection systems in Japan
E-commerce in Japan
Contactless smart cards
West Japan Railway Company
Fictional monotremes
2003 introductions
2003 establishments in Japan